The Most Esteemed Supreme Order of Sri Mahawangsa (Bahasa Melayu: Darjah Utama Sri Mahawangsa Yang Amat di-Hormati) is an honorific order of the Sultanate of Kedah.

History 
It was founded by Sultan Abdul Halim of Kedah in 2005.

Classes 
It is awarded in one class: 
 Member - DMK

Notable recipients 

 Sultan Abdul Halim of Kedah :

  Founding Grand Master of the Supreme Order of Sri Mahawangsa (DMK, since 2005)

Sultanah Haminah Hamidun :
  Member of the Supreme Order of Sri Mahawangsa (DMK, 20.1.2017)

Members of the Royal Family of Kedah : 
  Member of the Supreme Order of Sri Mahawangsa 
 Tunku Abdul Malik, Raja Muda DK DKH DMK SPMK PSB (1st younger brother of the Sultan and heir prince of Kedah) (DMK, 12.12.2011)  
 Tunku Annuar, Tunku Bendahara PSM DKH DMK SPMK SSDK PSB (2nd ygr br. of the Sultan and head of the Regency Council 2011) (DMK)

Lists of recipients 
 List of honours of the Kedah Royal Family by country
 List of Honours of Kedah awarded to Heads of State and Royals
 Category: Members of the Supreme Order of Sri Mahawangsa

References 

Sri Mahawangsa